Louis Keith Collier (born August 21, 1973) is an American former professional baseball utility player, who played in Major League Baseball (MLB) from  through . He was selected by the Pittsburgh Pirates in the 31st round of the 1992 Major League Baseball draft. Collier batted and threw right-handed.

Professional career
In , Collier was selected as the most valuable player of the South Atlantic League's all-star game after leading the National League affiliate teams to a 9–5 victory with three hits, including a home run. He reached the Majors in 1997 with the Pittsburgh Pirates, spending two years with them before moving to the Milwaukee Brewers (-), Montreal Expos, Boston Red Sox and Philadelphia Phillies (2004). In  with Pittsburgh, he posted career-highs in games played (110), hits (82), runs (30), RBI (34), doubles (13) and triples (6).

In 315 major league games, Collier was a .241 hitter with eight home runs and 78 RBI. In , he was invited by the Philadelphia Phillies to spring training after spending two seasons with the LG Twins and Hanwha Eagles in Korea Baseball Organization.

On June 1, 2007, as a member of the Ottawa Lynx, Collier announced his retirement from professional baseball. In , he was listed as a Chicago-based scout for the Kansas City Royals.

Personal life
Collier's son, Cam, is a baseball player. He was drafted in the first round, 18th overall, by the Cincinnati Reds in the 2022 Major League Baseball draft.

References

External links

Lou Collier at Baseball Almanac
Lou Collier at Pura Pelota (Venezuelan Professional Baseball League)
Lou Collier at Korea Baseball Organization

1973 births
Living people
African-American baseball players
American expatriate baseball players in Canada
American expatriate baseball players in South Korea
Augusta GreenJackets players
Baseball players from Chicago
Boston Red Sox players
Calgary Cannons players
Carolina Mudcats players
Hanwha Eagles players
Huntsville Stars players
Indianapolis Indians players
Kansas City Royals scouts
KBO League infielders
KBO League outfielders
Kishwaukee College alumni
Kishwaukee Kougars baseball players
LG Twins players
Louisville RiverBats players
Lynchburg Hillcats players
Major League Baseball outfielders
Major League Baseball second basemen
Major League Baseball shortstops
Major League Baseball third basemen
Milwaukee Brewers players
Montreal Expos players
Ottawa Lynx players
Pawtucket Red Sox players
Philadelphia Phillies players
Pittsburgh Pirates players
Salem Buccaneers players
Scranton/Wilkes-Barre Red Barons players
Tiburones de La Guaira players
American expatriate baseball players in Venezuela
Triton College alumni
Triton Trojans baseball players
Welland Pirates players
21st-century African-American sportspeople
20th-century African-American sportspeople